Yasmina Ismail Zaytoun (born October 26, 2002) is a Lebanese model and beauty pageant titleholder who was crowned Miss Lebanon 2022. She represented Lebanon at Miss Universe 2022 and will also compete at Miss World 2023.

Early life and education 
Zaytoun was born on October 26, 2002, in Tyre, and was raised in the city. Her father is from Kfarchouba, a village in the Hasbaya District of the Nabatieh Governorate, while her mother is of Palestinian descent. She entered Notre Dame University-Louaize in Zouk Mosbeh to pursue a bachelor's degree in journalism. In April 2021, she started hosting an education show titled With Yasmina Show.

Pageantry

Miss Lebanon 2022 
Zaytoun began her pageantry career in 2022, after she was selected to represent the district of Hasbaya at the Miss Lebanon 2022 pageant held at the Forum de Beyrouth in Beirut on July 24, 2022, where she competed with 16 other candidates for the title. Zaytoun advanced to the top nine, then the top 5, before being announced as the competition's winner, succeeding Miss Lebanon 2018 Maya Reaidy. During the virtual speech given by Miss USA 2010 Rima Fakih, the national director of Miss Universe Lebanon, it was announced that the winner of the pageant will also represent Lebanon at Miss Universe 2022 in addition to Miss World 2023.

References 

2002 births
Living people
Miss Universe 2022 contestants
Miss World 2022 delegates
Lebanese beauty pageant winners
Notre Dame University–Louaize alumni
People from Hasbaya District
Lebanese Sunni Muslims